Deliverance is the only album by English breakbeat hardcore and house music group Baby D, released in 1996. It features their three UK top 3 singles, "Let Me Be Your Fantasy", "(Everybody's Got to Learn Sometime) I Need Your Loving" and "So Pure".

Critical reception
Caroline Sullivan from The Guardian commented, "Dance music often fails to credit women vocalists adequately, so this jungle trio's decision to call themselves after their singer is laudable. It's appropriate, too, the Babe's ladylike tones being the key to their pop-friendly tunes." Pan-European magazine Music & Media wrote, "Former champions of the UK dance charts, these three musicians from London have crossed over to the UK chart big time. Which is not surprising, considering they make intelligent, innovative dance music." A reviewer for Music Week rated the album five out of five, adding, "Innovative mixes of trippy textures, blippy electronics, strong melodies and polished vocals have given Baby D three huge hit singles. This debut album delivers more of the same."

Track listing
"Got to Believe" – 5:33
"So Pure" – 7:02
"Destiny" – 4:02
"Come into My World" – 5:50
"Casanova" (Live) – 4:02
"Winds of Love" – 4:43
"(Everybody's Got to Learn Sometime) I Need Your Loving" – 5:37
"Daydreaming" – 5:19
"Euphoria" – 6:49
"Nature's Warning" – 6:31
"Take Me to Heaven" – 5:06
"Let Me Be Your Fantasy" – 7:50

Bonus Limited Edition Disc 

 "Have It All" – 4:17
 "Daydreaming (Acenhallucination)" – 5:21
 "Casanova (Prodigy Pump Action Remix)" – 4:57
 "So Pure (Rollin' Mix)" – 5:16

Trivia 

 "Daydreaming (Acenhallucination)" was remixed by Acen.
 "Casanova (Prodigy Pump Action Remix)" was remixed by The Prodigy.
 "So Pure (Rollin' Mix)" was remixed by Antix.

References

 

1996 debut albums
Breakbeat hardcore albums
Electronic dance music albums by English artists